Flotsam is a children's wordless picture book written and illustrated by David Wiesner. Published by Clarion/Houghton Mifflin in 2006, it was the 2007 winner of the Caldecott Medal; the third win for David Wiesner.  The book contains illustrations of underwater life with no text to accompany them.

Plot 
The book has no words, but is told through pictures. A boy is at the beach and finds an old camera. He takes the film to get it developed and sees photos of fantastical undersea cities and inventions. The final section of the book consists of a girl, who is holding a photo of a child, who is holding a photo of a child, who is holding a photo of a child, and so on.  The boy figures out that he is one in a long line of photographers who have found this camera.  He takes a picture of himself holding this photo and tosses the camera back into the ocean; it is carried across the ocean by a variety of fish and sea life until it again washes ashore and another child finds it.

Critical reception
Flotsam was published to glowing reviews. According to the Kirkus Reviews, “From arguably the most inventive and cerebral visual storyteller in children's literature comes a wordless invitation . . . not to be resisted.” Flotsam has won the 2007 Randolph Caldecott Medal for the most distinguished American picture book for children. Caldecott Medal Committee Chair Janice Del Negro has said of Flotsam, "Telling tales through imagery is what storytellers have done through the ages. Wiesner's wordless tale resonates with visual images that tell his story with clever wit and lively humor,". Horn Book Magazine says, "The meticulous and rich detail of Wiesner's watercolors makes the fantasy involving and convincing."

Awards
Awards
The 2007 recipient of the Caldecott Medal for illustration
A New York Times Best Illustrated Children's Book
A Publishers Weekly Best Book of the Year
A Kirkus Reviews Best Children's Book of 2006
A Booklist Editor's Choice 2006
A School Library Journal Best Book of 2006
A Horn Book Fanfare Title
A Child (magazine) Best Book of the Year
A Parenting (magazine) Book of the Year
A Nick Jr. Best Children's Book of 2006
A Book Sense Children's Pick, Autumn 2006
A Washington Post Top 10 Picture Book of the Year
A Parents' Choice Award Winner
A 2006 National Parenting Publications Gold Award Winner
New York Public Library, 100 Titles for Reading & Sharing
Chicago Public Library, Best Books of the Year
An Oppenheim Toy Portfolio Platinum Award Winner 2007

References

See also
Website dedicated to "Flotsam"
Audio interviews with author
Animated trailer for "Flotsam"

2006 children's books
American picture books
Caldecott Medal–winning works
Children's fiction books
Houghton Mifflin books
Wordless books